The Union for International Cancer Control (previously named International Union Against Cancer) or UICC is a non-governmental organisation with some 1,180 member organisations in more than 170 countries.

UICC was founded in 1933 and is based in Geneva, Switzerland. Its member organisations feature cancer societies, governmental agencies, treatment and research centres, patient support groups and professional associations.

History
UICC was established in Paris in 1933 following a proposal at a cancer congress in Madrid to create an international organisation that would "promote the fight against cancer through research, therapy and the development of social activities."

The organisation was given the Latin name , hence the acronym UICC, and the first General Assembly took place in Paris on 4 May 1935, with representatives from 67 national cancer organisations and 43 countries. The English name was changed in 2010 to its current name, Union for International Cancer Control so that the "UICC" acronym would be consistent with that for the French, Spanish and Latin texts.

The 1933 cancer congress in Madrid was considered the first "International Cancer Congress" and the second was held in Brussels in 1936 under the auspices of UICC. The third took place in Atlantic City, US, in 1939 before the activities of UICC were suspended due to World Word II. The fourth and fifth congresses were held in 1947 and 1950 respectively. Thereafter and until 2006, the international cancer congress – later named World Cancer Congress – and UICC’s General Assembly were held every four years; since 2006 they have been held every two years. The 2020 World Cancer Congress that was due to be held in Oman had to be called off because of the coronavirus pandemic.

The organisation moved to Geneva in 1948 to be close to the global health organisations. Today, UICC has official relations with the World Health Organization (WHO), has consultative status with the United Nations Economic and Social Council, sits on the Governing Council of the International Agency for Research on Cancer, and works closely with the Programme of Action for Cancer Therapy (PACT) initiated by the International Atomic Energy Agency.

Presidents of UICC

2022-2024       Prof. Jeff Dunn, AO (Australia)

2020–2022       Prof. Anil D’Cruz (India)

2018–2020       HRH Princess Dina Mired of Jordan (Jordan)

2016–2018       Prof. Sanchia Aranda (Australia)

2014–2016       Prof. Tezer Kutluk (Turkey)

2012–2014       Prof. Mary Gospodarowicz (Canada)

2010–2012       Dr Eduardo Cazap (Argentina)

2008–2010       Dr David Hill (Australia)

2006–2008       Dr Franco Cavalli (Switzerland)

2002–2006       Dr John Seffrin (US)

1998–2002       Dr E. Robinson (Israel)

1994–1998       Dr N. J. Gray (Australia)

1990–1994       Prof. S. Eckhardt (Hungary)

1986–1990       Prof. C. G. Schmidt (Germany)

1982–1986       Prof. Antonio Junqueira (Brazil)

1978–1982       Prof. U. Veronesi (Italy)

1974–1978       Prof P. Denoix (France)

1970–1974       Dr W. U. Gardner (US)

1966–1970       Dr N. N. Blokhin (USSR)

1962–1966       Prof. A. Haddow (United Kingdom)

1958–1962       Dr V. Khanolkar (India)

1953–1958       Prof. J. H. Maisin (Belgium)

1935–1953       M. J. Godart (France)

Mission and activities
The official mission statement of UICC reads: "UICC unites and supports the cancer community to reduce the global cancer burden, to promote greater equity, and to ensure that cancer control continues to be a priority in the world health and development agenda."

Its work on cancer control includes areas such as the elimination of cervical cancer, tobacco control, metastatic breast cancer, antimicrobial resistance, cancer and ageing, access to essential medicines, equity in healthcare, Universal Health Coverage and addressing cancer care in the time of the coronavirus pandemic.

UICC convenes the cancer community at events (World Cancer Congress, World Cancer Leaders’ Summit), organises thematic webinars, provides training, fellowships and grants, and advocates for effective cancer control. It is also behind World Cancer Day, an official international awareness day marked every year on February 4.

Scientific publications

UICC published the TNM Classification of Malignant Tumors in 1953 as the "Uniform Technique for a Clinical Classification by the TNM System", with the first pocket book edition issued in 1968. The Classification has been regularly updated and the 8th edition was published with John Wiley and Sons (Wiley) in 2017.

The peer-reviewed medical journal, the International Journal of Cancer, has been the official journal of UICC since 1966 and covers topics relevant to experimental and clinical cancer research.

UICC publishes with Wiley the Manual of Clinical Oncology with information on cancer detection, diagnosis and treatment, survivorship, special populations and palliative care.

The open-access, online-only JCO Global Oncology is published in partnership with the American Society of Clinical Oncology since 2015.

Governance
UICC is a non-governmental organisation governed by its member organisations, which meet in a general assembly held every two years. Between general assemblies a Board of Directors with 16 directors, elected at the general assembly, act as the executive body of UICC. At its head is the President of UICC, a position currently held by Prof Anil D’Cruz from India.

The organisation is managed by the CEO with a staff of some 40 employees, based in Geneva, Switzerland. The current CEO is Dr Cary Adams, who has held this position since 2009.

Member organisations, partners and other networks

UICC’s more than 1,200 members include cancer societies, governmental agencies, treatment and research centres, patient support groups and professional associations from around the world.

UICC also works with over 60 partners, including other health organisations, foundations and private sector companies committed to the fight against cancer.

In addition, UICC is a founding member of the NCD Alliance, the McCabe Centre for Law & Cancer, the International Cancer Control Partnership and established the City Cancer Challenge Foundation in January 2019.

See also
 American Cancer Society Cancer Action Network
 World Health Organization
 American Society of Clinical Oncology

References

External links
 
 PACT: Programme of Action for Cancer Therapy Program to establish cancer care capacity and comprehensive cancer control in developing world and a close partner of UICC

Cancer organisations based in Switzerland
International medical and health organizations
International organisations based in Switzerland